Saint William of Volpiano (Italian: Guglielmo da Volpiano; French: Guillaume de Volpiano, also of Dijon, of Saint-Benignus, or of Fécamp; June/July 962 – 1 January 1031) was a Northern Italian monastic reformer, composer, and founding abbot of numerous abbeys in Burgundy, Italy and Normandy.

Life and career

Not much is known about him. The main source is a Vita of the monk Raoul Glaber, a novice who accompanied William and who sometimes regarded his master as a rival, but also as a mentor who encouraged his work as a chronicler.

William was born on the family citadel on the island of San Giulio, Lake Orta, Novara, Piedmont. The son of Count Robert of Volpiano, he was born during an assault on the citadel by the Emperor Otto.  The assault being successful, Otto became the sponsor and patron of Count Robert's son.

The fourth son of Count Robert, in 969, at the age of seven, he began his education at the Benedictine abbey at Locadio, Vercelli.  He became a monk at this abbey. In 987, he became a monk at the Abbey of Cluny under Saint Majolus. Zealous for reform, Saint Majolus had reorganized Saint Sernin Abbey on the Rhône River.

William was ordained in 990 and served as abbot of Saint Benignus' Abbey at Dijon, dedicated to Saint Benignus of Dijon. Under William's direction, and his zeal for the Cluniac reform, St. Benignus' became a center of spirituality, education, and culture. It also became the mother house of some forty other monasteries in Burgundy, Lorraine, Normandy, and northern Italy.

In 1001, he was called to rebuild the destructed Abbey of Fécamp (present-day department of Seine-Maritime) by Richard II, where the Dukes of Normandy had their palace and had chosen to be buried. William had to supervise the (re)construction and to found several abbeys in Normandy (Bernay, and Mont Saint-Michel). In 1015 he became abbot of Jumièges Abbey.

He was chosen as building contractor for Mont Saint-Michel in the 11th century. He designed the Romanesque church of the abbey, daringly placing the transept crossing at the top of the mount.  Many underground crypts and chapels had to be built to compensate for this weight.  These formed the basis for the supportive upward structure that can be seen today. He also rebuilt the Abbey of Saint-Germain-des-Prés.

William died of natural causes at Fécamp.

Editions

See also 

William of Volpiano's fully notated tonary for the use at the Abbey Saint-Bénigne of Dijon

References

Sources

External links
 
  William of Volpiano in Normandy: current position
 William of Dijon
 The founders, the work of the first Dukes 933-1035

962 births
1031 deaths
People from Orta San Giulio
Italian Benedictines
French abbots
11th-century Italian architects
Italian untitled nobility
Italian saints
Cluniacs
11th-century Christian saints
Fécamp Abbey
Medieval French saints
Tonaries
Abbey of Fruttuaria